Ngerak Florencio (born 27 June 1983 in Koror, Palau) is a track and field sprint athlete who competed internationally for Palau.

Florencio represented Palau at the 2004 Summer Olympics in Athens. She competed in the 100 metres, where she finished 7th in the heat and did not advance to the next round.

References

External links
 

1983 births
Living people
Palauan female sprinters
Olympic track and field athletes of Palau
Athletes (track and field) at the 2004 Summer Olympics
People from Koror
Olympic female sprinters